Darinaparsin (trade names Darvias and Zinapar) is a drug for the treatment of various types of cancer. It is an arsenic-containing derivative of glutathione.

The mechanism of action of darinaparsin is proposed to involve disruption of mitochondrial function, increased production of reactive oxygen species, and modulation of intracellular signal transduction pathways, thereby inducing cell cycle arrest and apoptosis in cancer cells.

History
Darinaparsin and related compounds were first studied in the 1970s at Texas A&M University. It wasn't until 1998, when a connection between organoarsenic compounds and their potential use in cancer chemotherapy was reported, that interest in darinaparsin as a pharmaceutical drug began. Darinaparsin was licensed to Ziopharm Oncology and then Solasia Pharma for drug development.

Darinaparsin was granted Orphan Drug Designation in the US and Europe as a treatment for peripheral T-cell lymphoma (PTCL).

In Japan, darinaparsin was approved for relapsed or refractory PTCL in June 2022.

References 

Antineoplastic drugs
Organoarsenic compounds
Tripeptides